Nipponaphera wallacei is a species of sea snail, a marine gastropod mollusk in the family Cancellariidae, the nutmeg snails.

The specific name wallacei is in honor of Mr. Martin Wallace, who collected type specimens.

Description

Distribution
South Africa

References

wallacei
Gastropods described in 2000